The 2015–16 Drake Bulldogs women's basketball team represented Drake University during the 2015–16 NCAA Division I women's basketball season. The Bulldogs were led by fourth year head coach Jennie Baranczyk, and Jacqui Kalin served as an Assistant Women's Basketball Coach.

They played their home games at Knapp Center and were members of the Missouri Valley Conference. They finished the season 24–10, 14–4 in MVC play to finish in a tie for second place. They advanced to the semifinals of the Missouri Valley women's tournament where they lost to Missouri State. They were invited to the Women's National Invitation Tournament where they defeated Sacred Heart before losing to Missouri Valley member Northern Iowa in the second round.

Roster

Schedule

|-
!colspan=9 style="background:#004477; color:#FFFFFF;"| Exhibition

|-
!colspan=9 style="background:#004477; color:#FFFFFF;"| Non-conference regular season

|-
!colspan=9 style="background:#004477; color:#FFFFFF;"| Missouri Valley Conference regular season

|-
!colspan=9 style="background:#004477; color:#FFFFFF;"| Missouri Valley Women's Tournament

|-
!colspan=9 style="background:#004477; color:#FFFFFF;"| WNIT

Rankings

See also
2015–16 Drake Bulldogs men's basketball team

References

Drake Bulldogs women's basketball seasons
Drake
2016 Women's National Invitation Tournament participants